Phillips Heights is an unincorporated community in New Castle County, Delaware, United States. Phillips Heights is located east of the intersection of U.S. Route 13 Business and Marsh Road, northeast of Wilmington.

References 

Unincorporated communities in New Castle County, Delaware
Unincorporated communities in Delaware